Herbert Ziegler (8 October 1904 – 25 June 1944) was an Austrian equestrian. He competed in the individual eventing at the 1936 Summer Olympics.

Personal life
Ziegler served as an oberst (colonel) in the German Army during the Second World War and was killed in Italy on 25 June 1944. He is buried at Futa Pass Cemetery.

References

External links
 

1904 births
1944 deaths
Austrian male equestrians
Olympic equestrians of Austria
Equestrians at the 1936 Summer Olympics
Place of birth missing
German Army personnel killed in World War II
German Army officers of World War II